
Year 265 BC was a year of the pre-Julian Roman calendar. At the time it was known as the Year of the Consulship of Gurges and Vitulus (or, less frequently, year 489 Ab urbe condita). The denomination 265 BC for this year has been used since the early medieval period, when the Anno Domini calendar era became the prevalent method in Europe for naming years.

Events 
 By place 

 Greece 
 Although the Egyptian fleet blockades the Saronic Gulf, the Macedonian King Antigonus II defeats the Spartans and kills the king of Sparta, Areus I near Corinth, after which he besieges Athens.
 Acrotatus II succeeds his father Areus I as king of Sparta.

 Italy 
 Hiero II threatens to renew his attack on the Mamertines. They appeal to Carthage and receive the support of a Carthaginian garrison. The Mamertines also appeal to the Romans who are also willing to help.
 The Battle of Messana (265-264 BCE) takes place as the first military clash between the Roman Republic and Carthage.
 The Etruscan city of Volsinii is brought under Roman control. During a siege, the consul Quintus Fabius Maximus Gurges is killed.

 China 
 The State of Zhao stations general Li Mu in Yanmen Commandery, where he proceeds to win multiple victories over the Xiongnu.

 By topic 

 Arts & sciences 
 The Archimedes screw for raising water is devised by the Greek mathematician Archimedes, who is studying at Alexandria.

Births 
 Agis IV, king of Sparta (approximate date)
 Ziaelas, king of Bithynia (approximate date)

Deaths 
 Alexinus, Greek philosopher of Elis
 Areus I, king of Sparta (killed in battle)
 Quintus Fabius Maximus Gurges, Roman consul
 Xiang of Qi, Chinese king of Qi (Warring States Period)
 Xuan, Chinese queen dowager of Chu (b. 338 BC)

References